Gentleman  is a 2022 South Korean crime action film written and directed by Kim Kyung-won. Starring Ju Ji-hoon, Park Sung-woong and  Choi Sung-eun, the film depicts story of the president of a secret agency, who pretends to be a prosecutor to find a missing client and chases bad guys regardless of whether it is illegal or legal. It was released on December 28, 2022.

Cast
 Ju Ji-hoon as Ji Hyeon-soo  
 Park Sung-woong as Kwon Do-hoon
 Choi Sung-eun as Kim Hwa-jin
 Ko Ju-hee as paramedic
 Lee Hyeon-gyun as Prosecutor Kang
 Kang Hong-seok as Cho Chang-mo
 Lee Dal as Jo Pil-yong
 Park Hye-eun as a genius hacker

Production
Initially Han So-hee was offered the role along with Ju Ji-hoon in the film. Later Han So-hee left the cast due to health reasons and Park Sung-woong, and Choi Sung-eun joined the cast in August 2021.

The principal photography began on August 20, 2021 and was wrapped up on December 5. The Wavve original film was scheduled to be released in theaters and waves in 2022 after post-production.

Release

The film released on December 28, 2022, on 751 screens. The film has been sold in 42 countries, including Japan, Taiwan, Hong Kong, Vietnam, Russia and Poland. It is releasing in Taiwan on January 6, in Vietnam on January 27, and in Mongolia on February 9.

Home media
The film was made available for streaming on IPTV (KT olleh TV, SK Btv, LG U+ TV), Home Choice, Google Play, satellite TV (Skylife), WAVVE,  Naver Series ON from January 12, 2023.

Reception

Box office
The film opened at 3rd place with 44,056 admissions at the Korean box office. , it grossed $1,673,173 and have 219,807 admissions.

Critical response
Jung Jae-hyun of Cine21 reviewing the film praised the acting, writing, "The biggest strength of Gentleman, comes from the actors who gave 100% to save the charm of the characters." Jung was critical of twists in the story, writing, "The narrative of the film undergoes several plot twists, and these transitions do not mesh with the motivation of the characters." Concluding the review Jung also criticised the predictability of the endings of characters that they meet within the narrative." Jeong Ha-eun writing in Sports Seoul opined, "it is perfect for a killing time movie with moderate laughter and fun." Writing about acting Jeong said, "It feels like the character is wearing the actor's clothes." Concluding review she praised the director for playing the music to suit the scene, writing, "the exciting music that comes out in a tense situation creates a fresh atmosphere."

References

External links
 
 
 
 

2022 films
2022 crime action films
2020s South Korean films
2020s Korean-language films
South Korean crime action films